This article documents expected notable spaceflight events during the year 2025.

In 2025, NASA's Artemis Program is expected to launch the Artemis III mission, which will land astronauts near the south pole of the Moon. It is expected to be the first mission to land humans on the Moon since 1972.

The first uncrewed flight of Orel, Russia's replacement for the crewed Soyuz spacecraft, is scheduled for 2025. Russia also plans to launch the Spektr-UV (World Space Observatory-Ultraviolet), a space telescope that will be developed by multiple nations.

China plans to launch the Tianwen-2 (ZhengHe) asteroid sample-return and comet probe and the Chang'e 6 sample-return mission.

As of 2021, the mission of the Juno spacecraft orbiting Jupiter is targeted to end no later than September 2025. NASA has stated that the mission could end sooner depending on potential damage from the system's radiation belts during fly-bys of Europa in 2022, and Io in 2023 and 2024.

Orbital launches 

|colspan=8 style="background:white;"|

January 
|-

|colspan=8 style="background:white;"|

February 
|-

|colspan=8 style="background:white;"|

March 
|-

|colspan=8 style="background:white;"|

April 
|-

|colspan=8 style="background:white;"|

May 
|-

|colspan=8 style="background:white;"|

June 
|-

|colspan=8 style="background:white;"|

July 
|-

|colspan=8 style="background:white;"|

August 
|-

|colspan=8 style="background:white;"|

September 
|-

|colspan=8 style="background:white;"|

October 
|-

|colspan=8 style="background:white;"|

November 
|-

|colspan=8 style="background:white;"|

December 
|-

|colspan=8 style="background:white;"|

To be determined 
|-

|}

Suborbital flights 

|}

Deep-space rendezvous

Extravehicular activities (EVAs)

Orbital launch statistics

By country 
For the purposes of this section, the yearly tally of orbital launches by country assigns each flight to the country of origin of the rocket, not to the launch services provider or the spaceport. For example, Soyuz launches by Arianespace in Kourou are counted under Russia because Soyuz-2 is a Russian rocket.

By rocket

By family

By type

By configuration

By spaceport

By orbit

Expected maiden flights
 Cyclone-4M – Yuzhnoye – Ukraine
 MLV – Firefly Aerospace – USA
 SL1 – HyImpulse – Germany

Notes

References

External links

 
Spaceflight by year